Although the noun forms of the three words aim, objective and goal are often used synonymously, professionals in organised education define the educational aims and objectives more narrowly and consider them to be distinct from each other: aims are concerned with purpose whereas objectives are concerned with achievement.

Usually an educational objective relates to gaining an ability, a skill, some knowledge, a new attitude etc. rather than having merely completed a given task.  Since the achievement of objectives usually takes place during the course and the aims look forward into the student's career and life beyond the course one can expect the aims of a course to be relatively more long term than the objectives of that same course.

Sometimes an aim sets a goal for the teacher to achieve in relation to the learners, sometimes course aims explicitly list long-term goals for the learner and at other times there is a joint goal for the teacher and learner to achieve together. While the aim may be phrased as a goal for the teacher within the scope of the course it can also imply goals for the learner beyond the duration of the course. In a statement of an aim the third person singular form of the verb with the subject course, programme or module is often used as an impersonal way of referring to the teaching staff and their goals. Similarly the learner is often referred to in the third person singular even when they are the intended reader.

Course objectives
An objective is a (relatively) shorter term goal which successful learners will achieve within the scope of the course itself. Objectives are often worded in course documentation in a way that explains to learners what they should try to achieve as they learn.

Learning outcomes
The term learning outcome is used in many educational organisations, in particular in higher education where learning outcomes are statements about what students should be able to do by the end of a teaching session. Learning outcomes are then aligned to educational assessments, with the teaching and learning activities linking the two, a structure known as constructive alignment. Writing good learning outcomes can also make use of the SMART criteria and action verbs from Bloom's taxonomy.

In some organisations the term learning outcome is used in the part of a course description where aims are normally found. One can equate aims to intended learning outcomes and objectives to measured learning outcomes. A third category of learning outcome is the unintended learning outcome which would include beneficial outcomes that were neither planned nor sought but are simply observed.

See also

Educational psychology
Instructional scaffolding
Mastery learning
Model of hierarchical complexity
Outline of educational aims
Rubric (academic)
Structure of observed learning outcome

References

Curricula